In algebraic geometry, convexity is a restrictive technical condition for algebraic varieties originally introduced to analyze Kontsevich moduli spaces  in quantum cohomology. These moduli spaces are smooth orbifolds whenever the target space is convex. A variety  is called convex if the pullback of the tangent bundle to a stable rational curve  has globally generated sections. Geometrically this implies the curve is free to move around  infinitesimally without any obstruction. Convexity is generally phrased as the technical condition

 

since Serre's vanishing theorem guarantees this sheaf has globally generated sections. Intuitively this means that on a neighborhood of a point, with a vector field in that neighborhood, the local parallel transport can be extended globally. This generalizes the idea of convexity in Euclidean geometry, where given two points  in a convex set , all of the points  are contained in that set. There is a vector field  in a neighborhood  of  transporting  to each point .

Examples 
There are many examples of convex spaces, including the following.

Spaces with trivial rational curves 
These sheaves have trivial non-zero cohomology, and hence they are always convex. In particular, Abelian varieties have this property since the Albanese variety of a rational curve  is trivial, and every map from a variety to an Abelian variety factors through the Albanese.

Projective spaces 
Projective spaces are examples of homogeneous spaces, but their convexity can also be proved using a sheaf cohomology computation. Recall the Euler sequence relates the tangent space through a short exact sequence

 

If we only need to consider degree  embeddings, there is a short exact sequence

 

giving the long exact sequence

Homogeneous spaces 
Then, the pullback is always globally generated. This class of examples includes Grassmannians, projective spaces, and flag varieties.

Product spaces 
Also, products of convex spaces are still convex. This follows from the Kunneth theorem in coherent sheaf cohomology.

Projective bundles over curves 
One more non-trivial class of examples of convex varieties are projective bundles  for an algebraic vector bundle  over a smooth algebraic curvepg 6.

Applications 
There are many useful technical advantages of considering moduli spaces of stable curves mapping to convex spaces. That is, the Kontsevich moduli spaces  have nice geometric and deformation-theoretic properties.

Deformation theory 

   

where  is the point in the scheme representing the map. Convexity of  gives the dimension formula below. In addition, convexity implies all infinitesimal deformations are unobstructed.

Structure 
These spaces are normal projective varieties of pure dimension

   

which are locally the quotient of a smooth variety by a finite group. Also, the open subvariety  parameterizing non-singular maps is a smooth fine moduli space. In particular, this implies the stacks  are orbifolds.

Boundary divisors 
The moduli spaces  have nice boundary divisors for convex varieties  given by

   

See also 

 Stable curve
 Moduli space
 Gromov–Witten invariant
Quantum cohomology
Moduli of curves

References

External links 

Gromov-Witten Classes, Quantum Cohomology, and Enumerative Geometry
Notes on Stable Maps and Quantum Cohomology 
https://mathoverflow.net/q/39390

Algebraic geometry